Orgasm control can mean any of several sexual activities involving forcing, denying, postponing or extending orgasm, sometimes in combination:

 Forced orgasm, the forcing of an orgasm that is outside the recipient's voluntary control
 Orgasm denial, preventing the recipient from having orgasms
 Edging (sexual practice), postponing orgasm to achieve an ecstatic state